Aza Rakhmanova or Aza Hasanovna Rakhmanova (17 September 1932 – 18 November 2015) was a Russian AIDS and Hepatitis expert. She was credited with organizing AIDS prevention and control in St. Petersburg. She was one of the first to be treating HIV in the Soviet Union in 1987.

Life
Rakhmanova was born in Baku in 1932,. Her father was Hasan Pasha Rakhmanov and her mother Dr. Khavve-Hanoum Rakhmanova taught medicine in Semipalatinsk.

In 1941 her family were exiled ending up in Kazakhstan. There in Semipalatinsk she was able to continue a good education because Moscow professors had also been exiled to the same region. From 1949 to 1955 she studied in Leningrad before returning to work in Kazakhstan. Her family returned to Baku in 1959. She continued to study there and in Leningrad. In 1982 she became the Professor of Infectious Diseases at St. Petersburg Federal Medical University. Aza was Deputy Head of the St. Petersburg City AIDS Center.

She was editor-in-chief of the journal СПИД. Секс. Здоровье, which was the only journal in Russia on HIV / AIDS when it was first published in 1991. St Petersburg was a leader in Russia in dealing with AIiDS. She was an adviser to the Mayor Anatoly Sobchak as well as working at Russian hospitals dealing with thousands of cases of AIDS. Rakhmanova had to deal with patients and doctors. Brain surgeons preferred to not wear gloves and would later find out that their patient was HIV positive.

Rakhmanova died in Saint Petersburg in 2015 and was buried in Bolsheohtinskoe cemetery.

Publication
Aza wrote eleven books in addition to contributions to textbooks. She had about 330 published journal articles.

Awards include
Medal of the Order "For Merit to the Fatherland" II class
Honoured Science Worker of the Russian Federation
Aza was a member of the New York Academy of Sciences
Diploma from UNICEF for extensive contributions to the prevention and treatment of HIV among pregnant women and children.

References

1932 births
2015 deaths
Physicians from Baku
Russian infectious disease physicians
HIV/AIDS researchers
Academic journal editors
Soviet infectious disease physicians